GPS Air, formerly Global Plasma Solutions, is an indoor air quality company based in the United States that provides air conditioning and other air quality technologies for commercial and industrial buildings with a focus on using "needlepoint bi-polar cold plasma". The company produced room air quality products designed for schools, among other indoor locations, and after the outbreak of the COVID-19 pandemic thousands of schools purchased their products for preventing viral outbreaks.

Investigations by Boeing, air quality organizations such as the American Society of Heating, Refrigerating and Air-Conditioning Engineers (ASHRAE), and various academic researchers into the efficacy of the air purifiers GPS Air sold raised concerns about both their effectiveness and the potential negative health effects that could occur from the high levels of negative ions produced by the devices. In response, the company filed lawsuits against a member of ASHRAE and the academic publisher Elsevier.

History
Founded in 2008 in Savannah, Georgia, GPS Air was created as an air purification sales company focused on "needlepoint bi-polar cold plasma" as the primary function of its products. In October 2018, the company was purchased by the investment firm Falfurrias Capital Partners and had its headquarters moved to Charlotte, North Carolina.

Lawsuits
A class action lawsuit was filed in Maryland in May 2021 against GPS Air regarding their products using "needlepoint bipolar ionization" to inactivate microorganisms in the air. The suit claimed that the technology used by the devices was false advertising and did not function as stated, citing an investigation done by Kaiser Health News on the same devices that were sold to over 2,000 schools in the United States. Some counties, such as Shelby County, Tennessee, and cities, such as Charlotte, North Carolina, used millions of dollars from covid relief funds to install the devices in schools and other locations. The original testing done by GPS Air on the devices was scaled down due to the lack of a lab with the right equipment, resulting in a testing scenario involving an area the "size of a shoebox". This region was "blasted with 27,000 ions per cubic centimeter" and was stated by the company to be successful at reducing 99% of pathogens in the space, though it was later acknowledged by the company founder that the amount of ions the machines are able to routinely put out is 13 times lower when dealing with a normal sized room.

While a study originally conducted by the aerospace corporation Boeing in September 2020 on the devices did indicate its effectiveness, a subsequent study done by Boeing for a longer period of time found the devices to have "no observable reduction in viability" of E. coli in the testing area. GPS Air responded by stating that the study had been conducted on pathogens on surfaces and not in the air, with the latter being what the ionization devices were made to counteract. An additional study done at the University of Arizona found that the devices did indeed kill microorganisms when they were producing ions at "62,000 negative ions per cubic centimeter", but that this was an order of magnitude higher than the ion production rates of the devices under normal usage. Furthermore, other studies have found that ionization levels over 60,000 produced negative health impacts on humans.

After information about the lawsuit became public, the Newark, California, school district began removing the devices from area schools alongside concerns about the air quality being made worse by the technology.

Response to scientific criticism
An open letter was filed by a dozen scientists and engineers against the ionization technology and warning schools against installing such devices. This warning was amplified by the Asthma & Allergy Foundation of America and the Environmental Protection Agency due to the potential negative health impacts. The Centers for Disease Control were also prompted to advise the United States Department of Education to send out notices advising schools to require higher levels of scientific evidence of efficacy of such devices before purchasing them, with the Department of Education updating regulations and guidelines in June 2021.

One of the signatories of the open letter was Marwa Zaatari, a member of ASHRAE, who compiled a list of public information on school district spending in relation to the ionization products. In response to this and her statements in the media that independent research hasn't corroborated the claims of GPS Air, the company filed a lawsuit against Zaatari in April 2021 for $180 million. Additionally, GPS Air filed a lawsuit earlier in March 2021 against Francis J. Offermann, President of the consulting firm Indoor Environmental Engineering, for the publication of an article in the firm's newsletter critical of the company. A third lawsuit was filed against the academic publishing organization Elsevier for their publication of studies, including one by Colorado State University professor Delphine Farmer, on GPS Air's devices showing their lack of efficacy.

Products
Among others, one of the room mounted air purifiers made by GPS Air includes the GPS-FC24-AC that can be wall mounted in multiple small cassettes or to existing HVAC equipment. An additional device sold by the company is a "plasma generator" aimed at reducing the amount of microorganisms, including mold and allergens, in the air to prevent pets from becoming sick.

Awards
The Indoor Air Quality (IAQ) Gold award was given by The ACHR News magazine in their 2016 Dealer Design Awards to the company's GPS-iClean device for room air purification.

References

External links
 Official website

Companies established in 2008
Companies based in Savannah, Georgia
Companies based in Charlotte, North Carolina
Heating, ventilation, and air conditioning companies
2018 mergers and acquisitions
2008 establishments in Georgia (U.S. state)